INHS Patanjali is the naval hospital of the Indian Navy at Karwar, Karnataka which was commissioned on 26 December 2006. INHS Patanjali is the second naval establishment commissioned at Karwar. It has an initial capacity of 141 beds upgradeable to 400.

Objective 
Karwar is a premier base of Indian Navy on the western seaboard. The hospital is responsible for the medical support of the ships based in Karwar and other establishments. In addition, it provides preventive and curative care to all the servicemen and families of the Navy, DSC, NCC, Coast Guard, ex-servicemen and their dependents. Emergency services are extended to civilians as and when required.

See also 
 Indian navy 
 List of Indian Navy bases
 List of active Indian Navy ships
 INS Kadamba, major naval base on the west coast
 INS Vajrakosh, missile and ammunition base at Karwar

 Integrated commands and units
 Armed Forces Special Operations Division
 Defence Cyber Agency
 Integrated Defence Staff
 Integrated Space Cell
 Indian Nuclear Command Authority
 Indian Armed Forces
 Special Forces of India

 Other lists
 Strategic Forces Command
 List of Indian Air Force stations
 List of Indian Navy bases
 India's overseas military bases

References 

Military hospitals in India
Patan